RedGrey Team is a rally team based in Kurna, Estonia, established in 2020 by former rally driver Markko Märtin and the 2019 World Rally Champion, Ott Tänak. The team replaced an older team established in December 2005, MM-Motorsport, following Tänak's investment in Märtin's company that forms the team. The team rarely enters motorsport competition itself, principally offering rally cars for rent and associated operational services to customers, such as Hyundai Motorsport.

History

MM-Motorsport 
RedGrey's origins began in 2005 as MM-Motorsport, the competition entry and trading name used by Märtin's company, Triple-M. This team won consecutive Estonian Group N championships between 2006 and 2010. In 2011, Ott Tänak finished second in the Super 2000 World Rally Championship in cooperation with MM-Motorsport.

Between 2015 and 2019, MM-Motorsport operated Ford Fiesta R5 cars entered into the WRC by Tommi Mäkinen Racing and driven by Takamoto Katsuta on behalf of Toyota Gazoo Racing.

MM-Motorsport was replaced with RedGrey Team in 2020.

Activities

WRC2: Hyundai Motorsport N (2020–2022) 
In 2020, RedGrey began operating the official Hyundai Motorsport N entry in the WRC2 Championship with Hyundai i20 R5 and later, i20 N Rally2 cars. The contract between Hyundai Motorsport and RedGrey ended after 2022, making the partnership coincide with Tänak's tenure as a Rally1 driver for the Hyundai World Rally Team.

2020 
In the 2020 WRC2 season, Nikolay Gryazin and Ole Christian Veiby were entered as drivers for the team. The team finished third of four entries, with Gryazin and Veiby finishing fifth and fourth respectively in the driver's championship and level on points.

2021 
In 2021, the i20 N Rally2 car was debuted and several drivers had opportunities to drive with the team. After Rally Portugal, the entire membership of the RedGrey team were ordered to isolate in hotels within the country for two weeks following the discovery of a Covid-19 case within the team. Driver Ole Christian Veiby was banned from global motorsport for six months for breaching these quarantine rules.

The team finished the season fourth of five entries in the WRC2 team's championship.

2022 
Teemu Suninen and Fabrizio Zaldivar headed the campaign in the 2022 season. The team finished second, just two points behind champions Toksport.

After winning the teams class at Rally Finland, Suninen was disqualified for having an underweight bumper fitted. RedGrey team were found to have fitted a bumper used for testing which did not comply with the rules.

European Rally Championship

2023 
RedGrey entered the 2023 ERC season in their own name, they competed in the first round using Ford Fiesta Rally2 and Hyundai i20 N Rally2 cars for Robert Virves and Georg Linnamäe.

References

External links
 

2005 establishments in Estonia
World Rally Championship teams